Chamaedorea microspadix, or the hardy bamboo palm, is a species of flowering plant in the genus Chamaedorea, native to eastern Mexico (Hidalgo, Querétaro, San Luis Potosí, and Veracruz). Its multiple stalks are jointed, reminiscent of bamboo canes. It is dioecious.

When growing outdoors it prefers moist soil and indirect sunlight, and typically reaches . It does well in homes and commercial buildings, usually only reaching  when grown in containers. With its low maintenance requirements and showy red fruit, it has gained the Royal Horticultural Society's Award of Garden Merit.

References

microspadix
Endemic flora of Mexico
Flora of Hidalgo (state)
Flora of Querétaro
Flora of San Luis Potosí
Flora of Veracruz
Dioecious plants
Plants described in 1933
Taxa named by Max Burret